Saba Hameed is a Pakistani television actress. Saba has portrayed mother's role in many dramas & telefilms. She is better known for her roles in Kahin Deep Jaley, Mere Humsafar & Fitoor.

Early life 
Saba was born in Lahore, Pakistan to writer and columnist Hameed Akhtar. She studied at the Lahore College for Women University. Her siblings include three sisters and one brother.

Career 
Saba Hameed started her four-decade-long career as an actress in 1978 on television and also worked in theater from the mid-1980s to the mid-1990s.

Personal life 
Saba Hameed was previously married to Syed Pervaiz Shafi, with whom she had two children, daughter, actress and singer Meesha Shafi, and son Faris Shafi. She is currently married to actor Waseem Abbas.

Filmography

Films

Television

Awards and recognition
In 1987 she won Nigar Award for Best Actress for her role in drama Aasman.
In 2000 she won Best Actress Award at PTV Awards for her performance in family comedy drama Family Front
Pride of Performance Award by the President of Pakistan in 2012

Lux Style Awards
She holds the record for most nominations ever received by an actress without ever winning at the Lux Style Awards.

See also 
 List of Pakistani actresses

References

External links 

1957 births
Living people
Pakistani women comedians
20th-century Pakistani actresses
Pakistani stage actresses
Pakistani television actresses
Pakistani television producers
Punjabi people
Recipients of the Pride of Performance
Lahore College for Women University alumni
Actresses from Lahore
21st-century Pakistani actresses
PTV Award winners
Women television producers
People from Lahore
Nigar Award winners